Adolph Lestina (1861– August 23, 1923) was an American stage and film actor who was a member of D. W. Griffith's stock company of film actors.

Career 
He received positive notice for his performance in Justin McCarthy's If I Were King and in Laurence Irving's The Fool Hath Said There Is No God.

Lestina's performance in the play A Citizen's Home was noted as being "sympathetic".

Lestina was credited with "discovering" D. W. Griffith. "This gentleman saw to it that young Griffith played the role of Old Man Marks in The Lights o' London with the Meffert company [...] The gentleman who "discovered Griffith as an actor, Adolphe Lestina, later appeared in many D. W. Griffith film productions, including Hearts of the World (1918) and The Love Flower (1920)". Griffith, speaking of his time with the Meffert Stock Company, said that Lestina told him that to be a playwright, one first had to be an actor.

Personal life 
Adolph Lestina was married to Bessie Lee Lestina.

He died of heart disease in New Rochelle, New York on August 23, 1923.

Broadway credits 

 Children of the Ghetto (October 16, 1899 – December 1899)
 The School for Scandal (January 31, 1902 – January 31, 1902)
 The Eternal City (November 17, 1902 – February 1903)
 Our American Cousin (January 27, 1908 – April 25, 1908)
 A Citizen's Home (October 1, 1909 – October 1909)

Filmography 

 On the Reef (1910) (Short) as The Priest
 The Cord of Life (1909) (Short)
 The Honor of His Family (1910) (Short) as Servant
 The Last Deal (1910) (Short) as At Card Game
 Winning Back His Love (1910) (Short) as A Waiter
 The Two Paths (1911) (Short) as The Tempter
 The Italian Barber (1911) (Short) as Buying Newspapers / At Ball
 His Trust: The Faithful Devotion and Self-Sacrifice of an Old Negro Servant (1911) (Short) as Black Servant / Confederate Soldier
 His Trust Fulfilled (1911) (Short) as Freed Slave
 Fate's Turning (1911) (Short) as The Minister
 A Wreath of Orange Blossoms (1911) (Short) as At Party
 Heart Beats of Long Ago (1911) (Short) as Courtier
 What Shall We Do with Our Old? (1911) (Short) as The Doctor
 The Lily of the Tenements (1911) (Short) as One of the Father's Friends
 A Decree of Destiny (1911) (Short) as The Doctor
 Conscience (1911) (Short) as Detective
 Through Darkened Vales (1911) (Short) as Oculist's Assistant
 The Miser's Heart (1911) (Short) as The Miser
 A Woman Scorned (1911) (Short) as The Sneak Thief
 The Failure (1911) (Short) as The Bank Manager / In Tavern
 A Terrible Discovery (1911) (Short) as A Thug / One of the District Attorney's Friends
 The Old Bookkeeper (1912) (Short) as In Office
 The Sunbeam (1912) (Short) as 1st Health Inspector
 A String of Pearls (1912) (Short) as The Doctor
 A Lodging for the Night (1912) (Short) as A Deputy
 The Narrow Road (1912) (Short) as The Bartender
 The Inner Circle (1912) (Short) as The Widower
 So Near, Yet So Far (1912) (Short) as In Club
 A Feud in the Kentucky Hills (1912) (Short) as Second Clan Member
 The Chief's Blanket (1912) (Short) as The Doctor
 The Musketeers of Pig Alley (1912) (Short) as The Bartender / On Street
 My Baby (1912) (Short) as At Table
 My Hero (1912) (Short) as Settler
 The Burglar's Dilemma (1912) (Short) as The Butler
 The God Within (1912) (Short) as In Other Town
 An Adventure in the Autumn Woods (1913) (Short) as At Trading Post
 Brothers (1913) (Short) as The Doctor
 A Chance Deception (1913) (Short) as The Visitor
 Love in an Apartment Hotel (1913) (Short) as The Young Woman's Father
 Fate (1913) (Short) as In Bar
 A Welcome Intruder (1913) (Short) as The Construction Boss
 The Lady and the Mouse (1913) (Short) as The Doctor
 A Timely Interception (1913) (Short) as Uncle James's Friend
 Red Hicks Defies the World (1913) (Short) as Second Creditor
 The Mothering Heart (1913) (Short) as The Doctor / Club Patron
 Her Mother's Oath (1913) (Short) as The Justice of the Peace / In Church
 The Coming of Angelo (1913) (Short) as Teresa's Father
 The Adopted Brother (1913) (Short) as The Sheriff – Outside Sheriff's Office
 Her Wedding Bell (1913) (Short) as Wedding Guest
 Fruits of Desire (1916) as Rev. Courtenay
 The Yellow Passport (1916) as Chief of Police
 Hearts of the World (1918) as The Grandfather
 The Hun Within (1918) as Beth's father
 Battling Jane (1918) as Mr. Pollett
 The Greatest Thing in Life (1918) as Leo Peret
 A Romance of Happy Valley (1919) as Vinegar Watkins
 The Girl Who Stayed at Home (1919) as Mr. France
 Scarlet Days (1919) as Randolph's Friend
 The Idol Dancer (1920) as Black Slave
 Mary Ellen Comes to Town (1920) as Col. Fairacres
 The Love Flower (1920) as Bevan's Old Servant
 Orphans of the Storm (1921) as doctor

References

External links 

 
 
 
 Adolph Lestina at Broadway World

1861 births
1923 deaths
American male silent film actors
20th-century American male actors
American male stage actors